ABC Kids (originally titled Disney's One Saturday Morning until 2002) was an American Saturday morning children's programming block that aired on ABC from September 13, 1997 to August 27, 2011. It featured a mixture of animated and live-action series from Walt Disney Television Animation and Disney Channel, aimed at children between the ages of 6 and 12. This was the only time Disney Channel content aired on over-the-air television.

The block regularly aired on Saturday mornings, though certain programs within the lineup aired on Sundays in some parts of the country due to station preferences for non-educational programming or scheduling issues with regional or network sports broadcasts.

After five years of mainly repeats of programs introduced onto the block prior to the 2007–08 season, ABC decided it would cease to provide children's programming during the Saturday morning timeslot, and entered into an agreement with Litton Entertainment to program that period; the block that resulted from this deal – Litton's Weekend Adventure, which is structured as a syndication package distributed with virtual exclusivity to ABC's owned-and-operated stations and affiliates – replaced ABC Kids on September 3, 2011.

History

Disney's One Saturday Morning

Immediately after The Walt Disney Company purchased ABC corporate parent Capital Cities/ABC Inc. in 1996, the network's children's program block ABC Saturday Morning, aired such Disney-produced series as The Mighty Ducks, Jungle Cubs and Gargoyles; it was one of two networks at the time that prominently carried Disney programming on Saturday mornings, as CBS also carried Disney cartoons (CBS' were mostly television spin-offs of Disney Renaissance films, whereas ABC's were mostly other Disney properties). After Disney formally took over ABC's operations, Disney head Michael Eisner sought to create a Saturday morning block that was different from those carried by its competitors at the time.

In February 1997, Peter Hastings left Warner Bros. Animation and joined Disney, where he was tasked with overhauling ABC's Saturday morning lineup in order to compete against Fox Kids and Kids' WB. He pitched an idea around the concept that Saturday is different from every other day of the week, and the representation of weekdays as buildings. Hastings also proposed the use of virtual set technology; although he knew a bit about it at the time and the technology used was just starting to be developed, Disney and ABC liked the idea. He hired Prudence Fenton as consultant manager and co-executive producer. Together, they sampled virtual set technology at the 1997 NAB Show and chose technology developed by Accom and ELSET. Rutherford Bench Productions, which had previously worked with Disney on other projects, hired Pacific Ocean Post (now POP Sound) to produce the virtual set. The building was initially a drawing of Grand Central Terminal with a roller coaster added but evolved into a towering mechanical structure. Even the interior has similarities such as a central high raised room, with two wings on the left and right sides and another on the south side.

On September 13, 1997, Disney's One Saturday Morning premiered as a two-hour sub-block within the ABC Saturday Morning lineup. It was originally scheduled to debut the Saturday prior on September 6, but coverage by all U.S. networks of the funeral of Princess Diana pushed back the premiere up one week to September 13. Disney’s One Saturday Morning featured two parts: three hours of regularly scheduled cartoons and a two-hour flagship show that included feature segments, comedy skits, and the virtual world which Hastings had proposed, along with newer episodes of three animated series: Doug (which had been acquired from Nickelodeon in 1996), Recess and Pepper Ann.

Doug, Recess and Pepper Ann were each nominally given 40-minute time slots. The extended 10 minutes during each show's slot were for One Saturday Morning's interstitial segments and educational features. The live-action wraparound segments were originally hosted by Charlie (portrayed by Jessica Prunell) for the block's first season in 1997, and later by MeMe (Valarie Rae Miller) beginning in September 1998; the segments also featured an elephant named Jelly Roll (voiced by stand up comedian and actor Brad Garrett), who served as a sidekick to the human host. Schoolhouse Rock!, a longtime essential of ABC's Saturday morning block since 1973, also aired as an interstitial segment during The Bugs Bunny and Tweety Show, the only non-Disney cartoon to carry into the block and one that would air until 2000, when the carriage contract with Warner Bros. was exhausted. 

Disney’s One Saturday Morning was initially a massive success, beating Fox Kids during its first season to be the most-watched Saturday morning block on broadcast television. It remained competitive in its second season, beating all of Fox Kids' shows except Power Rangers. The block received a new brand identity in the fall of 2000; this was followed by the shorts and hosted segments being discontinued on December 16 in a reformatting of the ABC block. By this time, the interstitials within the block were relegated to bumpers and program promotions. In the fall of 2001, live-action series were added to the One Saturday Morning lineup with the addition of the "Zoog Hour," an hour-long sub-block featuring the Disney Channel original series Lizzie McGuire and Even Stevens (the sub-block, advertised in promos for Disney’s One Saturday Morning promoting the two programs as "powered by Zoog," was named after Disney Channel's weekend programming block at the time, Zoog Disney).

A spin-off of Disney's One Saturday Morning, Disney's One Too, debuted on UPN on September 6, 1999; produced through a time-lease agreement between Disney and UPN, the block aired each weekday (either in the morning or afternoon, depending on the station's preference) and on Sunday mornings, and featured many of the programs shown on One Saturday Morning (including Recess, Pepper Ann and Sabrina: The Animated Series).

ABC Kids
On July 23, 2001, the Walt Disney Company purchased Fox Family Worldwide, primarily for its Fox Family Channel, which was included in the sale as well as Saban Entertainment, a company in which Fox purchased a 50% interest in 1994. On September 14, 2002, ABC rebranded its Saturday morning block, as a subtle nod to the Fox Kids brand acquired by Disney through its purchase of Fox Family Worldwide, to ABC Kids (as a result of the sale, Fox Kids ceased to exist; Fox's children's program lineups would be handled from that point onward by 4Kids Entertainment until 2008).

The rechristened block originally contained a mix of first-run programs exclusive to the block, as well as reruns of several original series from both Disney Channel and Toon Disney. NBA Inside Stuff also began airing on the block as a result of ABC's acquisition of the broadcast television rights to the NBA from NBC (where the series originally premiered in 1992), beginning with the 2002–03 season's Christmas Day game; Inside Stuff continued to air on ABC Kids until 2004. The new block abandoned the imagery of the One Saturday Morning era in favor of a sports motif, which remained throughout the ABC Kids era.

Through Disney's acquisition of Saban Entertainment, ABC also moved the Power Rangers series from Fox Kids to the ABC Kids block. All first-run episodes from the franchise premiered on ABC Kids beginning with the second half of the show's Wild Force season (starting with the episode "Unfinished Business"), with the entirety of the Wild Force and Ninja Storm seasons subsequently airing in reruns on ABC Family (the former season aired in part both before the introduction of and during the ABC Family Action Block). However, when Toon Disney and ABC Family jointly launched the action-oriented Jetix block in 2004, Jetix handled all first-run episode debuts of subsequent seasons from Dino Thunder to Jungle Fury, while ABC Kids aired these seasons in reruns. Due to the merger between Jetix and Toon Disney to form Disney XD in 2009, the RPM season aired exclusively on ABC Kids, after which ABC canceled production of the series. Instead of producing a new season, ABC aired a re-version of the first 32 episodes of Mighty Morphin Power Rangers, which included a new logo, an updated title sequence, comic book-referenced graphics, and extra alternative visual effects. The re-version aired from January 2 to August 28, 2010, after which Nickelodeon acquired rights to the franchise.

In the 2004–05 season, ABC Kids dropped its two remaining original series, Fillmore! and Recess (the latter of which was airing in reruns on the block since it ended in 2001). With the expanded regulation of federally mandated educational programming guidelines defined by the Federal Communications Commission's Children's Television Act, and the debut of Good Morning America Weekend that fall (rival network NBC later noted that morning news shows caused a major viewership clash with cartoons, and ABC was the last of the Big Three networks to add a Saturday morning newscast), ABC chose to fulfill the three-hour quota by carrying select episodes of Disney Channel live-action comedies and animated series (anywhere between 9 and 13 episodes from a given season) featuring moral lessons and/or educational anecdotes. The episodes were selected by both the Standards and Practices Division of the network and any educational consultants who were attached to the shows. The Emperor's New School, The Replacements and Hannah Montana were the last Disney Channel series to be added to the block in 2006. Beginning with the 2007–08 season, ABC Kids programming (with the exception of Power Rangers) was fully automated, putting the same handful of episodes of each show (The Emperor's New School, The Replacements, That's So Raven, Hannah Montana and The Suite Life of Zack & Cody) on a permanent rotation for the block's remaining four years.

The closure of ABC Kids
In March 2010, ABC decided to stop providing a three-hour block of E/I-compliant, repurposed Disney Channel programming sent to its own stations and ABC affiliates. The network chose to lease out the three-hour time slot and seek other programmers for an agreement to produce a syndicated block, not for the network, but for each ABC station as the network was turning the E/I responsibility back to local ABC stations.

In April 2010, ABC's affiliate board announced that it had reached a deal with Litton Entertainment, a production company which produces syndicated programming (including educational programs aimed at children and teenagers), to produce six, all-new, original half-hour E/I series exclusively for ABC stations for the 2011–12 season.

The block aired for the final time on August 27, 2011 without any announcement of its closure, and was quietly replaced by Litton's Weekend Adventure the following week on September 3, 2011. As a result, ABC discontinued airing animated programming, making it the first network not to air animated series within its children's program lineup since August 1992, when NBC discontinued its animation block on Saturday mornings to launch the live-action block TNBC.

Programming
Note: Every show that premiered before September 14, 2002 aired during the One Saturday Morning era. 
1 Indicates that the program also ran on syndication or ABC prior to the block.
2 Indicates that the program moved to Toon Disney for its episode premieres. 
3 Indicates that the program also aired under the Jetix brand.

Final programming

Former programming

See also
 The Disney Afternoon – a Disney-produced syndicated children's program block that ran from 1990 to 1997.
 Disney's One Too – a programming block that aired on UPN from 1999 to 2003 as a successor to UPN Kids.

References

External links
 Official Home Page of Disney's One Saturday Morning

ABC Kids (TV programming block)
 Children's television networks in the United States
 Television channels and stations established in 1997
 Television channels and stations disestablished in 2011